The Devil Goblins from Neptune is a BBC Books original novel written by Martin Day and Keith Topping (developed from an original idea by Day, Topping and Paul Cornell) and based on the long-running British science fiction television series Doctor Who. It was the first novel published in the Past Doctor Adventures range and features the Third Doctor, UNIT, The Brigadier, and Liz Shaw.

Synopsis
The Brigadier is pursued across the world from seeming traitors within UNIT, his own organization. The Doctor and Liz deal with an alien invasion that started with an extraterrestrial mass exploding in the atmosphere.

Continuity

The events of the novel take place between the television stories Inferno and Terror of the Autons.

The Devil Goblins are mentioned in the Big Finish Doctor Who audio drama Find and Replace.

References

External links

The Devil Goblins from Neptune Pre-Prologue
The Cloister Library - The Devil Goblins from Neptune

1997 British novels
1997 science fiction novels
Past Doctor Adventures
Third Doctor novels
Novels by Martin Day
Novels by Keith Topping